In graph theory, a part of discrete mathematics, the BEST theorem gives a product formula for the number of Eulerian circuits in directed (oriented) graphs.  The name is an acronym of the names of people who discovered it: de Bruijn, van Aardenne-Ehrenfest, Smith and Tutte.

Precise statement  
Let G = (V, E) be a directed graph.  An Eulerian circuit is a directed closed path which visits each edge exactly once.  In 1736, Euler showed that G has an Eulerian circuit if and only if G is connected and the indegree is equal to outdegree at every vertex.  In this case G is called Eulerian.  We denote the indegree of a vertex v by deg(v).

The BEST theorem states that the number ec(G) of Eulerian circuits in a connected Eulerian graph G is given by the formula

Here tw(G) is the number of arborescences, which are trees directed towards the root at a fixed vertex w in G. The number tw(G) can be computed as a determinant, by the version of the matrix tree theorem for directed graphs.  It is a property of Eulerian graphs that tv(G) = tw(G) for every two vertices v and w in a connected Eulerian graph G.

Applications 
The BEST theorem shows that the number of Eulerian circuits in directed graphs can be computed in polynomial time, a problem which is #P-complete for undirected graphs.  It is also used in the asymptotic enumeration of Eulerian circuits of complete and complete bipartite graphs.

History 
The BEST theorem is due to van Aardenne-Ehrenfest and de Bruijn
(1951), §6, Theorem 6.
Their proof is bijective and generalizes the de Bruijn sequences.  In a "note added in proof", they refer to an earlier result by Smith and Tutte (1941) which proves the formula for graphs with deg(v)=2 at every vertex.

Notes

References 
.
.
.
.
. Theorem 5.6.2
.

Directed graphs
Theorems in graph theory